Carveth Geach (1928–2005) served as the Chief Scout of the Boy Scouts of South Africa.

In 1990, Geach was awarded the 205th Bronze Wolf, the only distinction of the World Organization of the Scout Movement, awarded by the World Scout Committee for exceptional services to world Scouting.

References

External links

Recipients of the Bronze Wolf Award
1928 births
Scouting and Guiding in South Africa
2005 deaths
Chief Scouts